The Nokia 6500 classic is a mobile phone from Nokia announced on May 31, 2007. The phone runs the Series 40 platform. The case is made of brushed aluminium. At just 9.5 mm thick, the 6500 classic was Nokia's thinnest phone when released in October 2007. It is notable for being Nokia's few Series 40 phones with a large internal memory, 1 GB (along with the Nokia 7900 and others). It also had a similar sliding variant called Nokia 6500 slide. Both of them were the first Nokia phones where the miniUSB port was replaced by microUSB.

References

External links

 A detailed review at Mobile Review
 The stress test of a Nokia 6500 Slide

6500 classic
Mobile phones introduced in 2007